Old Town Cemetery, also known as Old Taylor Cemetery and Old Haynesville Cemetery, is a cemetery located south of Haynesville, in Claiborne Parish, Louisiana, United States. The cemetery use to be located near the old town center for Haynesville, however the town center moved 2 miles east with the arrival of new train tracks which left this old town area as a "ghost town". 

The cemetery contains some 3,000 burials. Fashion designer Geoffrey Beene (1924–2004) is buried there.

References

External links
 Old Town Cemetery – interment.net
 
 

Buildings and structures in Claiborne Parish, Louisiana
Cemeteries in Louisiana